is a former Japanese football player.

Playing career
Ikeda was born in Saitama on 18 May 1970. After graduating from Waseda University, he joined his local club, the Urawa Reds, in 1993. He played often as an offensive midfielder. However, he did not play as much in 1997. In 2000, he moved to the newly promoted J1 League club, Kawasaki Frontale. However, he still did not play very often and he moved to the J2 League club Mito HollyHock in 2001. He retired at the end of the 2002 season.

Personal life
Ikeda married wrestler Miyuu Yamamoto in 1995. They divorced in 1999.

Club statistics

References

External links

1970 births
Living people
Waseda University alumni
Association football people from Saitama Prefecture
Japanese footballers
J1 League players
J2 League players
Urawa Red Diamonds players
Kawasaki Frontale players
Mito HollyHock players
Association football midfielders